The 2020 United States House of Representatives elections in Hawaii was held on November 3, 2020, to elect the two U.S. representatives from the state of Hawaii, one from each of the state's two congressional districts. The elections coincided with the 2020 U.S. presidential election, as well as other elections to the House of Representatives, elections to the United States Senate and various state and local elections. The state's primary elections were held on August 8, 2020.

Beginning with the 2020 election cycle, per Act 136, Session Laws of Hawaii 2019, all state elections are conducted by mail.

Overview

District
Results of the 2020 United States House of Representatives elections in Hawaii by district:

District 1

The 1st district is located entirely on the island of Oahu, centering on Honolulu and the towns of, Aiea, Mililani, Pearl City, Waipahu and Waimalu. The incumbent is Democrat Ed Case, who was elected with 73.1% of the vote in 2018.

Democratic primary

Candidates

Nominee
 Ed Case, incumbent U.S. Representative

Primary results

Republican primary

Candidates

Nominee
Ron Curtis, engineer and nominee for U.S. Senate in 2018

Eliminated in Primary
James Dickens, salesman
Nancy Olson, family nurse practitioner
Arturo Reyes, perennial candidate
Taylor Smith

Primary results

Nonpartisan primary
According to election laws of Hawaii, in order for nonpartisan candidates to appear on the general election ballot, they had to receive at least 10% of votes cast (16,529 votes) or receive as many or more votes than any other candidate that won a partisan nomination (≥ 13,873 votes). Griffin failed to do either, and will not appear on the November ballot.

Candidates

Disqualified
Calvin Griffin

Primary results

General election

Predictions

Results

District 2

The 2nd district takes in rural and suburban Oahu, including Waimanalo Beach, Kailua, Kaneohe, Kahuku, Makaha, Nanakuli, as well as encompassing all the other islands of Hawaii, taking in Maui and Hilo. The incumbent is Democrat Tulsi Gabbard, who was reelected with 77.4% of the vote in 2018 and announced that she would run for President of the United States in 2020. Hawaii law permits candidates to run for both Congress and the presidency.

On October 25, 2019, Gabbard announced she would not seek reelection to focus on her presidential campaign. However, she suspended her campaign on March 19, 2020, after lower result ratings in the primaries and endorsed former Vice President Joe Biden's campaign. Hawaii's Office of Elections forbids candidate filing for any of the state's 2020 elections after June 2, 2020.

Democratic primary

Candidates

Nominee
 Kai Kahele, state senator

Defeated in Primary
 Brian Evans, singer and Republican nominee for Hawaii's 2nd congressional district in 2018
 Noelle Famera, small business owner and activist (endorsed Hoomanawanui after the primary elections)
 Brenda Lee

Withdrawn
David Cornejo, software engineer
Ryan Meza, investor, entrepreneur, and a consultant (endorsed Famera)

Declined
Alan Arakawa, former mayor of Maui
Kirk Caldwell, mayor of Honolulu
Bernard Carvalho, former mayor of Kauai
Beth Fukumoto, former state representative
Tulsi Gabbard, incumbent U.S. Representative, former 2020 candidate for U.S. President
Kaniela Ing, former state representative
Donna Mercado Kim, state senator and former President of the Hawaii Senate
Chris Lee, state representative
Ernie Martin, former chair of the Honolulu City Council
Jill Tokuda, former state senator

Endorsements 

Tulsi Gabbard vs. Kai Kahele

Tulsi Gabbard vs. Generic Opponent

Primary results

Republican primary

Candidates

Nominee
Joe Akana, U.S. Air Force veteran

Defeated in primary
Steven Bond
Karla Bart Gottschalk, retired civil rights lawyer and candidate for U.S. Senate in 2016
David Hamman, locksmith
Elise Hatsuko Kaneshiro
Nicholas Love, pastor
Robert Nagamine, former lieutenant colonel in the Hawaii Air National Guard
Raymond Quel, security protection specialist
Felipe San Nicolas, former telecommunications manager

Declined
 Samuel Wilder King II, attorney
 Steve Rousseau

Primary results

Libertarian primary

Candidates

Nominee
Michelle Rose Tippens, executive director and Libertarian nominee for Hawaii's 1st congressional district in 2018

Primary results

American Shopping primary

Candidates

Nominee
John Giuffre, perennial candidate

Primary results

Aloha Aina primary

Candidates

Nominee
Jonathan Hoomanawanui, VFW service officer

Primary results

Nonpartisan primary
According to election laws of Hawaii, in order for nonpartisan candidates to appear on the general election ballot, they had to receive at least 10% of votes cast (17,049 votes) or receive as many or more votes than any other candidate that won a partisan nomination (≥ 133 votes). Burrus fulfilled the latter requirement and was on the November ballot.

Candidates

Nominee
Ron Burrus, analyst

Eliminated in primary
Byron McCorriston, entrepreneur

Primary results

General election

Predictions

Results

See also
 2020 Hawaii elections

Notes

References

External links
 
 
  (State affiliate of the U.S. League of Women Voters)
 

 Official campaign websites for 1st district candidates
 Ed Case (D) for Congress
 Ron Curtis (R) for Congress

 Official campaign websites for 2nd district candidates
 Joe Akana (R) for Congress
 Jonathan Hoomanawanui (AĀ) for Congress
 Kai Kahele (D) for Congress
 Michelle Rose Tippens (L) for Congress

Hawaii
2020
House